The cuisine of Libya is Arab and Mediterranean with Italian influence. One of the most popular Libyan dishes is bazin, an unleavened bread prepared with barley, water and salt. Bazin is prepared by boiling barley flour in water and then beating it to create a dough using a magraf, which is a unique stick designed for this purpose. Pork consumption is forbidden, in accordance with Sharia, the religious laws of Islam.

In Tripoli, Libya's capital, the cuisine is particularly influenced by Italian cuisine. Pasta is common, and many seafood dishes are available. Southern Libyan cuisine is more traditionally Arab with Berber influence. Common fruits and vegetables include figs, dates, oranges, apricots and olives.

Common foods and dishes

 

Bazin is a common Libyan food made with barley flour and a little plain flour, which is boiled in salted water to make a hard dough, and then formed into a rounded, smooth dome placed in the middle of the dish. The sauce around the dough is made by frying chopped onions with lamb meat, turmeric, salt, cayenne pepper, black pepper, fenugreek, sweet paprika, and tomato paste. Potatoes can also be added. Finally, boiled eggs are arranged around the dome. The dish is then served with lemon and fresh or pickled chili peppers, known as amsyar. Batata mubattana (filled potato) is another popular dish that consists of fried potato pieces filled with spiced minced meat and covered with egg and breadcrumbs.

Additional common foods and dishes include:

 Asida is a dish made of a cooked wheat flour lump of dough, sometimes with added butter, honey or rub.
 Bazin
 Rishta.
 Breads, including flatbreads
 Bureek, turnovers
 Couscous, a North African dish of semolina
 Filfel chuma or maseer, spicy pickled peppers, Lemon t and hot peppers and crushed garlic.
 Ghreyba, butter cookies
 Harissa is hot chili sauce commonly eaten in North Africa. Main ingredients include chili peppers, such as bird's eye chili and serrano peppers, and spices such as garlic paste, coriander, red chili powder, caraway and olive oil.
 Hassaa, type of gravy
 Magrood, date-filled cookies
 Mhalbiya, type of rice pudding
 Mutton, meat of an adult sheep
 Rub is a thick dark brown, very sweet syrup extracted from dates or carob that is widely used in Libya, usually with asida.
 Shakshouka is prepared using aged mutton or lamb jerky as the meat base of the meal, and is considered a traditional breakfast dish.
 Shorba, lamb and vegetable soup with mint and tomato paste
    Imbakbaka or Mbakbaka,  a type of stew with pasta and meat; originating from Italy's minestrone
 Usban, a traditional Libyan food made of Guts stuffed with Organs and herbs.
 Kifta,
 Boourdeem, Meat cooked underground using primitive methods

Desserts and beverages

 Makroudh
 Ghoriba
 Maakroud
 Drua - (Libyan salep made from millet)
 Mafruka
 Kunafa
 Zumeeta
 Libyan tea, the Libyan tea is a thick beverage served in a small glass, often accompanied by peanuts. Regular American/British coffee is available in Libya, and is known as "Nescafé" (a misnomer). Soft drinks and bottled water are also consumed. The Maghrebi mint tea is also a popular drink.

All alcoholic drinks have been banned in Libya since 1969, in accordance with Sharia, the religious laws of Islam. However, illegally imported alcohol is available on the black market, alongside a homemade spirit called Bokha. Bokha is often consumed with soft drinks as mixers.

See also

 Culture of Libya
 Arab culture
 Arab cuisine
 List of African cuisines

References

 
Arab cuisine
North African cuisine
Mediterranean cuisine
Maghrebi cuisine